This is a list of the number ones of the UK Official Download Chart.

List of UK Official Download Chart number-one albums
List of UK Official Download Chart number-one singles

See also
List of best-selling music downloads in the United Kingdom
List of number-one singles (UK)
List of number-one albums (UK)
List of UK Compilation Chart number ones
List of UK Official Download Chart Christmas number ones

External links
Album Download Chart at the Official UK Charts Company
Singles Download Chart at the Official UK Charts Company

British record charts